Pipe marking is the used to identify the contents, properties and flow direction of fluids in piping. Marking assists personnel to identify the correct pipes for operational, maintenance or emergency response purposes. Pipes are marked by labels, typically color coded, to identify the use, contents and flow direction.

Background 
Pipes are used extensively in commercial and industrial buildings and on industrial plant (e.g. oil refineries) to transfer fluids between items of plant and equipment. Positive identification assists operations personnel to correctly identify plant when carrying out routine or maintenance activities, and for emergency personnel when responding to emergencies. Pipe marking is particularly important for identification where pipes run along pipe racks, through walls and bulkheads and through floors. 

A range of corporate, national and international codes, standards and regulations are in use around the world.

ANSI/ASME Standards
In the United States, Occupational Safety and Health Administration regulations recommend following American Society of Mechanical Engineers Standard A13.1-2015 - Scheme for the Identification of Piping Systems.

The standard states that labels should be placed where easily viewed by a person standing near the pipe at any of the following points:

 Valves and flanges.
 A pipe passes through a wall or floor.
 Any pipe direction changes, such bends or junctions.

2015 revisions

2015 revisions added oxidizing materials to the existing 'Flammables' classification. The other major change allowed and encouraged labels to incorporate the GHS signal word, hazard pictograms, and hazard statements. This addition helped identify additional dangers when dealing with materials that fit into multiple categories, like Hydrogen sulfide, which is both flammable and toxic.

IIAR Bulletin #114

In 2014, the International Institute of Ammonia Refrigeration introduced a specialized label design for use when marking pipes associated with refrigeration systems using ammonia, including information such as the physical state, pressure and purpose in the system.

NFPA 99C 2002
The National Fire Protection Association have a special labeling system in the standard for Health Care Facilities, such as hospitals and dentistry offices. This standard puts more emphasis on gases found in Medical gas supply systems, which consist of both oxidizing gases and gases that displace oxygen.

United Kingdom Regulations 
In the United Kingdom there are three principal regulations that mandate the marking of equipment and piping:

 Classification, Labelling and Packaging of Chemicals (Amendments to Secondary Legislation) Regulations 2015,
 Health and Safety (Safety Signs and Signals) Regulations 1996,
 Provision and Use of Work Equipment Regulations 1998,

The regulations require that vessels containing hazardous substances together with the pipes containing or transporting such substances must be labelled or marked with the relevant hazard pictograms or pipe marking. The labels used on pipes must be positioned visibly in the vicinity of the most hazardous points, such as valves and joints; at both sides of bulkheads and floor penetrations; and at reasonable intervals.

The regulations do not specify a specific marking system, but BS EN ISO 7010 Graphical symbols — Safety colours and safety signs is often used.

BS EN ISO 7010 
A widely used British (BS), European (EN) and International (ISO) standard for marking equipment is:

 BS EN ISO 7010:2019 Graphical symbols — Safety colours and safety signs — Registered safety signs
The Standard stipulates the colours to be used. These are as follows:

In addition to the basic colours, certain safety colours are used:

The arrangement of markings is for the safety colour to be between bands of the basic colour.

Firewater service would be:

The pipe contents must be identified adjacent to the banding. This can be done by giving either:

 The full name
 Abbreviation
 Chemical symbol
 Refrigerant number
 Coloured bands (user specified)

The direction of flow should also be identified near the banding.

Examples using this system are as shown.

Ships and marine facilities (ISO 14726) 
Ships and marine facilities must conform to an international standard for piping systems identification. This is ISO 14726:2008 Ships and marine technology — Identification colours for the content of piping systems.

This is a two-colour banded marking system. The main colour shows what the fluid is being used for. This is on either side of the secondary colour which indicates what the substance actually is. The main colours are as follows:

  Black - Waste media
  Blue - Fresh water
  Brown - Fuel
  Green – Sea water
  Grey - Non-flammable gases
  Maroon - Air and sounding pipes
  Orange - Oils other than fuels
  Silver - Steam
  Red - Fire fighting
  Violet - Acids, alkalis
  White - Air in ventilation systems
  Yellow - Flammable gases

International Standard ISO 20560-1 
International Standard ISO 20560-1 Safety information for the content of piping systems and tanks — Part 1: Piping systems was intended to replace the variety of regulations and standards across countries and regions. Basic identification colours and warning symbols identify the pipe contents and any hazards.

Pipe markers consists of 4 basic elements:

 Basic identification colour
 Name of the substance/content
 Flow direction indicator arrows
 Warning symbols

Colours and substances are typically as follows:

See also
 Piping
 American National Standards Institute
 American Society of Mechanical Engineers

Notes

References

Piping
Civil engineering
Hazardous materials
Chemical safety